Sainte-Paule is a municipality in Quebec, Canada.

Demographics

Population

Private dwellings occupied by usual residents: 129 (total dwellings: 217)

See also
 List of municipalities in Quebec

References

Incorporated places in Bas-Saint-Laurent
Municipalities in Quebec
Canada geography articles needing translation from French Wikipedia